Three ships of the Royal Navy have borne the name HMS Wager. Another was planned but later cancelled:

  was a 24-gun sixth rate purchased in 1739 and wrecked in 1741.
  was a 24-gun sixth rate launched in 1744 and sold in 1763.
 HMS Wager was to have been a modified W-class destroyer. She was laid down in 1918 but was cancelled later that year.
  was a W-class destroyer launched in 1943. She was sold to the Yugoslav Navy in 1956 and renamed Pula, and was withdrawn from service in 1971.

Royal Navy ship names